This is a family tree of the Sasanian emperors, their ancestors, and Sasanian princes/princesses.

History
The Sasanian dynasty was named after Sasan, the eponymous ancestor of the dynasty. It was founded by Ardashir I in 224, who defeated the last Parthian (Arsacid) king, Artabanus IV ( Ardavan) and ended when the last Sasanian monarch, Yazdegerd III (632–651), lost a 19-year struggle to drive out the early Arab Caliphate, which was the first of the Islamic empires.

It is believed that the following dynasties and noble families have ancestors among the Sasanian rulers:

 The Dabuyid dynasty (642–760), descendants of Jamasp.
 The Paduspanids (665–1598) of Mazandaran, descendants of Jamasp.
 The Shahs of Shirwan (1100–1382), from Hormizd IV's line.
 The Banu Munajjim (9th–10th century), from Mihr Gushnasp, a Sasanian prince.
 The Kamkarian family (9th–10th century), a dehqan family descended from Yazdegerd III.
 The Mikalids (9th–11th century), a family descended from the Sogdian ruler Divashtich, who was, in turn, a descendant of Bahram V Gur.

Sasanian family tree 
The solid lines indicate parent-to-child lineage and the dotted lines indicate questionable blood relationships.

See also
List of shahanshahs of the Sasanian Empire
Bavandid family tree

Notes

References

External links 
The Sasanid rulers of Persia (detailed genealogy)

Family trees